Last Words of the Executed is a book by Robert K. Elder published in 2010. Studs Terkel contributed a foreword. The book documents the final words of death row inmates in the United States, from the seventeenth century to the present day. The chapters are organized by era and method of execution. In each case, Elder also provides short descriptions of the inmates’ backgrounds and purported crimes.

Chapters 

The Noose
The Firing Squad
The Electric Chair
The Gas Chamber
Lethal Injection

Press 

Bryan Appleyard of the Sunday Times of London warns, "“This is, in short bursts, a fascinating book. But, having read it almost in one go, I must warn you that it is also depressing...So take it easy." Rob Warden, executive director of the Center on Wrongful Convictions, said, “This is a powerful, haunting book. Whether you favor or oppose the death penalty, you won’t think the same way after reading the last words of the condemned.”

References

External links 
Official Site of Robert K. Elder
Last Words of the Executed

2010 non-fiction books
Last words